Josef Neumann (18 March 1911 – 8 April 1994) was a Swiss athlete. He competed in the men's javelin throw at the 1936 Summer Olympics. At the 1938 European Athletics Championships, he won bronze in the men's decathlon.

References

External links
 

1911 births
1994 deaths
Athletes (track and field) at the 1936 Summer Olympics
Swiss male javelin throwers
Olympic athletes of Switzerland
Place of birth missing